Alexeyevskoye is an urban locality (an urban-type settlement) and the administrative center of Alexeyevsky District in the Republic of Tatarstan, Russia, located on the Kama River on the left bank of the Kuybyshev Reservoir. As of the 2010 Census, its population was 11,224.

History
It was established in 1710 and was granted urban-type settlement status in 1965.

Administrative and municipal status
Within the framework of administrative divisions, the urban-type settlement of Alexeyevskoye serves as the administrative center of Alexeyevsky District, of which it is a part. As a municipal division, Alexeyevskoye is incorporated within Alexeyevsky Municipal District as Alexeyevskoye Urban Settlement.

References

Notes

Sources

Urban-type settlements in the Republic of Tatarstan
Laishevsky Uyezd
Populated places on the Kama River